Mima Mounds Natural Area Preserve is a state-protected Natural Area in southwest Washington state, United States. The preserve includes some of the Washington mima mounds, the origin of which still is not fully understood. The site comprises  of Garry oak woodland, oak savanna, and prairie grasslands. Several state and federal endangered species of butterfly depending on the unique prairie conditions can be found in the preserve, including Mardon skipper, zerene fritillary, Puget blue and Taylor's checkerspot.

In 1966, the mima mounds were designated a National Natural Landmark.

See also
 Rocky Prairie

References

External links

Protected areas of Thurston County, Washington
Washington Natural Areas Program
National Natural Landmarks in Washington (state)
Landforms of Thurston County, Washington
Protected areas established in 1976
1976 establishments in Washington (state)